Howard Jackson may refer to:
Howard Jackson (kickboxer) (1951–2006), American kickboxer
Howard W. Jackson (1877–1960), mayor of Baltimore
Howard Jackson (composer) (1900–1966), American film composer